La Toya Mason (born 21 July 1984) is an English rugby union player and coach. She represented  at the 2010 Women's Rugby World Cup and was also named in the squad to the 2014 Women's Rugby World Cup. Born and raised in Auckland, New Zealand, Mason qualified for England through her four grandparents who are all English born.

Mason was selected for the 2017 Women's Rugby World Cup squad.

References

External links

1984 births
Living people
England women's international rugby union players
English female rugby union players
Female rugby union players
New Zealand rugby union players
Rugby union players from Auckland